Glen Burnie station (formerly Cromwell / Glen Burnie) is a Baltimore Light Rail station in Glen Burnie, Maryland. It is one of the system's two southern terminals, and one of two stations in Glen Burnie. Trains depart Glen Burnie bound for Timonium station (during peak commuting hours on weekdays) or Hunt Valley station (at all other times). Unlike the nearby Ferndale station, there are currently 795 free parking spaces and connections can be made to MTA Maryland's Route 14 bus from here. South of the station, the lines terminate on an embankment on the northwest corner of Maryland Route 648 and Maryland Route 176 to the east of Interstate 97, and the right of way is replaced by the Baltimore and Annapolis Rail Trail.

Station layout

Nearby attractions
Being the southernmost Light Rail stop, Glen Burnie Station provides access to numerous points of interests throughout northern Anne Arundel County. The Baltimore & Annapolis Trail provides a direct cycling link (13.3 miles) from the station to Maryland's capital, Annapolis. Nearby attractions include:
Anne Arundel Community College Glen Burnie Campus
Army National Guard
Cromwell Field Shopping Center
Cromwell Business Park
Downtown Glen Burnie
Glen Burnie District Courthouse
Glen Burnie High School
Glen Burnie Plaza Shopping Center
Monsenior Slade Catholic School
Sawmill Creek Park

References

External links
Schedules
Station portal (local train and bus times)

Baltimore Light Rail stations
Glen Burnie, Maryland
Railway stations in Anne Arundel County, Maryland
Railway stations in the United States opened in 1887
Railway stations in the United States opened in 1993